Keziekie Ward is a ward located under Nagaland's capital city, Kohima. The ward falls under the designated Ward No. 3 of the Kohima Municipal Council.

Education
Educational Institutions in Keziekie Ward:

Schools 
 Keziekie Government Primary School

See also
 Municipal Wards of Kohima

References

External links
 Map of Kohima Ward No. 3

Kohima
Wards of Kohima